Artistic control or creative control is a term commonly used in media production, such as movies, television, and music production.  A person with artistic control has the authority to decide how the final product will appear.  In movies, this commonly refers to the authority to decide on the final cut.  When a director does not have artistic control, the studio that is producing the project commonly has the final say on production.

When dealing with numeric values, artistic (or creative) control usually refers to the commanding portion of an executive deal or contract, so a share such as 51% and 49%, respectively, for shareholders or stocks would denote the shareholder with 51% as having control. 50 and 50 percent share an equal commanding portion, and so must come to terms on both sides.

It is very rare for a successful musical artist to have full artistic control. Some current artists with full artistic control include Radiohead, Björk and Kanye West.

In professional wrestling, it refers to the booker or a clause in a wrestler's contract.

See also
 Final cut privilege

Film production
Music production
Professional wrestling